This is a summary of the electoral history of Adam Hamilton, Leader of the National Party (1936–40), and Member of Parliament for  (1919–22, 1925-1946).

Parliamentary elections

1919 election

1922 election

1925 election

1928 election

1931 election

1935 election

1938 election

1943 election

Leadership elections

1936 leadership election

1940 leadership election

Notes

References

Hamilton, Adam
New Zealand National Party leaders